Bend Over Boyfriend (BOB) is a series of sex education videos covering the practice of a woman penetrating a man's anus with a strap-on dildo (known as pegging). The first of the two videos, which was released in 1998, became the best-selling video to date for Good Vibrations, a sex-toy business. The video was also featured on The Daily Show. The videos promote the idea, as Eye Weekly puts it, that "fucking your boyfriend in the ass is fun".

The videos star sexologist Carol Queen, who discusses pegging and also demonstrates the practice with her lover. The videos also contain footage of other couples engaging in the practice. The porn star Chloe appears in the second video; as she is best known as an anal queen, her use of a strap-on dildo is a "role reversal".

Bend Over Boyfriend (1998) and Bend Over Boyfriend 2 (1999) were created, produced, and directed by lesbian couple Shar Rednour and Jackie Strano, owners and founders of SIR Video Productions. The movies feature real life couples. BOB was co-produced with Nan Kinney of Fatale Media and was nominated for Best Specialty Release at the 1999 AVN Awards.

Dan Savage, who popularized the term pegging, originally offered "bob" (short for "Bend over Boyfriend") as one of two alternatives for the term.

Reception
Some reviewers, such as Eye Weekly, said the tapes are instructional to a fault, saying the presentation "made anal sex seem more distasteful rather than more attractive". Queen said she was told the first video was "like watching a driving-instruction video", and the subtitle of Bend Over Boyfriend 2: Less Talkin', More Rockin''' attempts to address this concern.

Tristan Taormino, writing for the Village Voice, credits the video as an archetype for a substantial cultural shift: "The roles of active initiator and penetrator are no longer solely the domain of men, nor are the qualities of receptivity and passivity for girls only. Nowhere is this more apparent than in what I identify as the Bend Over Boyfriend Archetype." Taormino also went on to add that the video makers were resistant to visualizing or showing close-ups of the male buttocks in this video.

References

Further reading
Brietzke, Carol. (January 1999) Cosmopolitan Ecstasy. (Using mints during oral sex). Volume 226; Issue 1; Page 76.
The Scotsman. (January 28, 1999) BSC raises porn fears over Channel 5 shows.Playboy (February 1999) The Playboy Advisor. Volume 46; Issue 2; Page 39.
Nathan, Debbie. (April 19, 1999) The Nation Sodomy for the Masses.(sodomy illegal in many States). Volume 268; Issue 14; Page 16.
Taormino, Tristan. (March 7, 2000) The Village Voice Bend over, boys! Volume 45; Issue 9; Page 144.
Taormino, Tristan. (May 2, 2000) The Village Voice [Pucker up.] Volume 45; Issue 17; Page 142.
Graves, Ginny. (June 1, 2000) Redbook 5 Sexy things he's longing for you to try in bed. Volume 194; Issue 6; Page 138.
Taormino, Tristan. (December 26, 2000) The Village Voice Nice and naughty. Volume 45; Issue 51; Page 162.
Savage, Dan. (June 22, 2001) The Portland Mercury Finally, an honest election.Hoffman, Kevin. (November 21, 2002) Scene Entertainment Weekly The Safety Dance: At Oberlin, even sex fests are conducted by the book. Volume 32; Issue 99.
Taormino, Tristan. (May 7, 2003) The Village Voice The queer heterosexual. Volume 48; Issue 19; Page 141.
Cudmore, Doug. (December 14, 2003) The Toronto Star Seven ways to get on the "naughty" list. Section: Metropolis; Page 4.
Salt Lake City Weekly (March 17, 2005) Porn and Prejudice. Volume 21; Issue 43; Page 20.
Powers, Thom. (September 11, 2005) Los Angeles Times Porn is bad for society and bad for you. Right? Pornified How Pornography Is Transforming Our Lives, Our Relationships, and Our Families Pamela Paul Times Books: 306 pp., $25. Section: Book Review; Page 4.
Taormino, Tristan. (May 17, 2006) The Village Voice The Pinky Swear: Benefits of prostate stimulation and the rise of bend-over boyfriends. Volume 51; Issue 20; Page 137.
Lynch, Janel M. (September 1, 2006) Curve Nan Kinney: founder, Fatale Media. Volume 16; Issue 7; Page 63
Moore, Candace. (March 1, 2007) Curve Who makes the rules? And why are they so much fun to break? Volume 17; Issue 2; Page 66
Savage, Dan. (August 8, 2007) Philadelphia Weekly Savage Love.''

External links
 Video of Dan Savage being interviewed on the Colbert Report

Anal eroticism
Sex education 
1990s pornographic films
1990s English-language films
Direct-to-video films